A spreader is a spar on a sailing boat used to deflect the shrouds  to allow them to better support the mast. The spreader or spreaders serve much the same purpose as the crosstrees and tops in a traditional sailing vessel.

Spreader design and tuning can be quite complex. The spreaders may be fixed (rigid) or swinging (pivoted at the mast). The purpose of the spreaders is to control, by either limiting, or inducing, bend into the spar so that when the windward shroud is loaded the mast achieves the desired bend characteristics. The spreaders may be designed to be angled in a way that either forces bend in to the spar or reduces bend, depending on the desired results.

Sailing rigs and rigging

de:Saling
fr:Barre de flèche
no:Salingshorn